John Meyrick (1674 – c. 1735) was a Welsh politician and judge.

A member of an established Pembrokeshire family, he represented the parliamentary constituencies of Pembroke between 1702 and 1708, and Cardigan between 1710 and 1712.  He was later puisne judge of the Anglesey circuit (1712–1714).

References

1674 births
1730s deaths
Members of the Parliament of England (pre-1707) for constituencies in Wales
Members of the Parliament of Great Britain for Welsh constituencies
18th-century Welsh judges
Alumni of Jesus College, Oxford
People from Pembrokeshire
English MPs 1702–1705
English MPs 1705–1707
British MPs 1707–1708
British MPs 1710–1713